The Modern Library 100 Best Nonfiction was created in 1998 by the Modern Library. The list is what it considers to be the 100 best non-fiction books published since 1900.

The list included memoirs, textbooks, polemics, and collections of essays. A separate list of the 100 best novels of the 20th century was created the same year.

The following table shows the top ten books from the editors' list:

A list chosen by readers was published separately by Modern Library in 1999. With close to 200,000 votes, The Virtue of Selfishness by Ayn Rand was selected as the best non-fiction book. Two other titles related to Rand – Objectivism: The Philosophy of Ayn Rand and Ayn Rand: A Sense of Life – were No. 3 and No. 6, respectively. The Reader's Poll has been cited by Harry Binswanger, a longtime associate of Rand and promoter of her work, as representative of "the clash between the intellectual establishment and the American people." However, Jesse Walker, writing in Reason magazine, has observed that the Reader's Poll is an example of the unreliability of internet polls and their tendency to overemphasize the opinions of small but especially devoted groups.

References

External links
The Modern Library list

1998 establishments in the United States
Awards established in 1998
American non-fiction literary awards
Top book lists